Solar Energy Corporation of India Ltd. (SECI) is a company of the Ministry of New and Renewable Energy, Government of India, established to facilitate the implementation of the National Solar Mission (NSM). It is the only Central Public Sector Undertaking (PSU) dedicated to the solar energy sector. The company's mandate has been broadened to cover the entire renewable energy domain and the company will be renamed to Renewable Energy Corporation of India (RECI).

The company is responsible for implementation of a number of government schemes, major ones being the VGF schemes for large-scale grid-connected projects under NSM, solar park scheme and grid-connected solar rooftop scheme, along with a host of other specialised schemes such as defence scheme, solar canals, and Indo-Pak border scheme.

In addition, SECI has ventured into solar project development on turnkey basis for several PSUs. The company also has a power-trading licence and is active in this domain through trading of solar power from projects set up under the schemes being implemented by it.

Background 
The SECI was registered as Section 25 under the Companies Act, 1956 (now Section 8 of the Companies Act, 2013) on 9 September 2011. It was set up as a Non-for-Profit Company to promote solar energy in India.

Though SECI was not meant to make profits, it made profits of ₹12 crores in 2014–15 following which the Union Cabinet under the chairmanship of Prime Minister Narendra Modi gave its approval to the SECI to:
 Converting it into Section 3 Company under the Companies Act, 2013, and
 Renaming it as Renewable Energy Corporation of India (RECI)
The major impact of the decision will be:
 SECI will become a self-sustaining and self-generating organisation with its own solar power plants that will generate and sell power.  It will also help the company in other segments of solar sector activities, including manufacturing of solar products and materials since it was not allowed earlier.
 SECI will become RECI after change of its name and then will take up development of all segments of renewable energy namely, geo-thermal, off-shore wind, tidal etc. apart from solar energy.
In 2016, SECI also faced huge challenges. Since India’s reverse auction mechanism has not stabilized the market and system in 2016, SECI has conducted 9 auctions. However, most of the projects were unable to proceed normally, and many bids were under-subscribed.

References

See also
 Solar power in India
 Tata Power Solar
 Solairedirect

2011 establishments in Delhi
Indian companies established in 2011
Government-owned companies of India
Ministry of New and Renewable Energy
Companies based in New Delhi
Solar energy companies of India